Daniel Barringer may refer to:

 Daniel Laurens Barringer (1788–1852), U.S. Congressman from North Carolina, 1825–1834
 Daniel Moreau Barringer (1806–1873), U.S. Congressman from North Carolina, 1843–1849
 Daniel Barringer (geologist) (1860–1929), American geologist, best known for proving Meteor Crater (Arizona) is an impact crater